Sudeep Chatterjee is an Indian cinematographer, who mainly works in Hindi films and Bengali films. He has collaborated with critically acclaimed directors like Buddhadeb Dasgupta, Nagesh Kukunoor, Srijit Mukherji, Sanjay Leela Bhansali, and Vishal Bharadwaj. He is mostly known for his work in films like Iqbal (2005), Chak De India (2007), Guzaarish (2010), Dhoom 3 (2013), Chotushkone (2014), Bajirao Mastani (2015),Padmaavat (2018) and Gangubai Kathiawadi (2022). He has received the National Film Award for Best Cinematography, twice, for Chotushkone and Bajirao Mastani.

Early life and education
Chatterjee was born and raised in Kolkata.  After he passed class 10 his father gave him a camera, which in time provided him with a career direction. After he finished his schooling he joined an engineering college, but after only eight months he left it to join the Film and Television Institute of India (FTII), Pune, where he studied cinematography.

Career
After graduating from Film and Television Institute of India, he started his career in Kolkata making advertisements and documentaries, eventually after two years, filmmaker Anjan Dutt offered him Bada Din (1997), a Hindi film starring Shabana Azmi. Thereafter he shifted based to Mumbai and started working TV series and commercials for a year before he shot Ram Gopal Verma's Road (2002).

Soon was working in film across genres, action, thriller and drama, and his in Salman Khan starrer, Lucky: No Time for Love (2005), where he shot the picturesque locales of Russia, followed by Nagesh Kukunoor's successive films Iqbal (2005) and Dor (2006), and Jaan-E-Mann (2005) got him attention, and he got to do Chak De! India (2007) directed by Shimit Amin, where he grained and desaturated the film, and shot almost 80% of the movie with a hand-held camera, eventually winning him accolades and the 2008 Filmfare Award for Best Cinematography, IIFA Award for Best Cinematography and Zee Cine Award for Best Cinematography amongst others. His next important work was in Bengali film, Kaalpurush (2008), directed by acclaimed film director of Bengali cinema, Buddhadev Dasgupta, and starring Mithun Chakraborty and Rahul Bose, the film won the National Film Award for Best Feature Film.

In 2010 came Guzaarish directed by Sanjay Leela Bhansali starring Hritik Roshan and Ashwariya Rai, Sudeep had previously apprenticed with Sanjay, also a fellow FTII student, in 1942: A Love Story, where he was the song director. Guzaarish Won IIFA, Screen, and Apsara award for best Cinematography.

He followed it up with the big budget super successful entertainer Dhoom 3  (2013). He then worked in the film Chotushkone (2014) directed by critically acclaimed director Srijit Mukherji for which Chatterjee won the prestigious National Film Award for Best Cinematography.

Chatterjee followed up with his second consecutive National award in 2015 with the highly acclaimed Bajirao Mastani directed by Sanjay Leela Bhansali.

He again collaborated with Sanjay Leela Bhansali for the critically and commercially successful period piece Padmavat (2018). He is currently shooting the period drama Gangubai Kathiawadi (2021) directed by Sanjay Leela Bhansali and much anticipated Brahmastra (2022) directed by Ayan Mukherjee.

He is presently a member of the Advisory Board of the Kautik International Student Film Festival

Filmography

Films

Web series

Documentary
 Sachin: A Billion Dreams (2017) - a multi-lingual (English, Hindi, Marathi) documentary sports film.

Awards and nominations

References

External links
Official website
 
 Sudeep Chatterjee - a cinematographer with variety
 

Hindi film cinematographers
Living people
Artists from Kolkata
Film and Television Institute of India alumni
Filmfare Awards winners
20th-century Indian photographers
21st-century Indian photographers
Cinematographers from West Bengal
Best Cinematography National Film Award winners
Year of birth missing (living people)